Baron Swinfen, of Chertsey in the County of Surrey, is a title in the Peerage of the United Kingdom. It was created in 1919 for the lawyer and judge Sir Charles Swinfen Eady upon his retirement as Master of the Rolls. He died only two weeks after his elevation to the peerage and was succeeded by his only son, the second Baron.  the title is held by the latter's grandson, the fourth Baron, who succeeded in 2022.

The third baron and his wife set up the Swinfen Charitable Trust in 1998, with the aim of assisting poor, sick and disabled people in the developing world. The Trust establishes telemedicine links between hospitals in the developing world and specialists who give free advice by e-mail.

The author Mary Wesley was the first wife of the second Baron Swinfen and the mother of the third Baron.

Barons Swinfen (1919)
Charles Swinfen Eady, 1st Baron Swinfen (1851–1919)
Charles Swinfen Eady, 2nd Baron Swinfen (1904–1977)
Roger Mynors Swinfen Eady, 3rd Baron Swinfen (1938–2022)
Charles Roger Peregrine Swinfen Eady, 4th Baron Swinfen (b. 1971)

There is no heir to the barony.

Arms

Notes

References

Kidd, Charles & Williamson, David (editors). Debrett's Peerage and Baronetage (1990 edition). New York: St Martin's Press, 1990, 

Baronies in the Peerage of the United Kingdom
Noble titles created in 1919